Sangam refers to the assembly of the highly learned people of the ancient Tamil land, with the primary aim of advancing the literature. There were historically three Sangams. With the details of the first two Sangams remaining obscure, all the available Sangam works come from the Third Sangam, which began sometime around 1500 BCE. It is said to have lasted 1850 years, until around 300 CE, with 449 poets contributing under the patronage of 49 Pandyan kings. However, only the works of the last 800 years of the Sangam period have been retrieved and others are believed to have been lost.

List of Sangam poets
Below is a list of poets of the Third Sangam period:

See also
 Third Sangam
 Sangam landscape

References

Further reading

External links 
 Sangam Poets and Poems

Sangam literature
Tamil-language literature
Ancient Tamil Nadu
Indian literature
Cultural history of Tamil Nadu